Setophaga is a genus of birds of the New World warbler family Parulidae. It contains at least 33 species. The males in breeding plumage are often highly colorful. The Setophaga warblers are an example of adaptive radiation with the various species using different feeding techniques and often feeding in different parts of the same tree.

Most Setophaga species are long-range migrants, wintering in or near the New World tropics and seasonally migrating to breed in North America. In contrast, two Setophaga species, the palm warbler and yellow-rumped warbler, have winter ranges that extend along the Atlantic coast of North America as far north as Nova Scotia.

Taxonomy
The genus Setophaga was introduced by the English naturalist William Swainson in 1827. The type species was subsequently designated by Swainson in the same year as the American redstart Setophaga ruticilla.

Genetic research has suggested that Dendroica and Setophaga should be merged. This change has been accepted by both the North American and South American Classification Committees of the American Ornithological Society and the IOC World Bird List. Most members of the genus as currently recognized were traditionally classified as the genus Dendroica, 29 species at the time of the merger. The only member of the genus Setophaga prior to the merger was the American redstart. As the name Setophaga (published in 1827) takes priority over Dendroica (published in 1842), those who accept the merger transfer all the species below to Setophaga.

List of species 

 Adelaide's warbler, Setophaga adelaidae
 American redstart, Setophaga ruticilla
 American yellow warbler, Setophaga petechia
 Arrowhead warbler, Setophaga pharetra
 Bahama warbler, Setophaga flavescens
 Barbuda warbler, Setophaga subita
 Bay-breasted warbler, Setophaga castanea
 Blackburnian warbler, Setophaga fusca
 Blackpoll warbler, Setophaga striata
 Black-throated blue warbler, Setophaga caerulescens
 Black-throated green warbler, Setophaga virens
 Black-throated grey warbler, Setophaga nigrescens
 Cape May warbler, Setophaga tigrina
 Cerulean warbler, Setophaga cerulea
 Chestnut-sided warbler, Setophaga pensylvanica
 Elfin woods warbler, Setophaga angelae
 Golden-cheeked warbler, Setophaga chrysoparia
 Grace's warbler, Setophaga graciae
 Hermit warbler, Setophaga occidentalis
 Hooded warbler, Setophaga citrina
 Kirtland's warbler, Setophaga kirtlandii
 Magnolia warbler, Setophaga magnolia
 Northern parula, Setophaga americana
 Olive-capped warbler, Setophaga pityophila
 Palm warbler, Setophaga palmarum
 Pine warbler, Setophaga pinus
 Plumbeous warbler, Setophaga plumbea
 Prairie warbler, Setophaga discolor
 Saint Lucia warbler, Setophaga delicata
 Townsend's warbler, Setophaga townsendi
 Tropical parula, Setophaga pitiayumi
 Vitelline warbler, Setophaga vitellina
 Myrtle warbler, Setophaga coronata
 Audubon's warbler, Setophaga auduboni
 Black-fronted warbler, Setophaga auduboni nigrifrons
 Goldman's warbler, Setophaga goldmani
 Yellow-throated warbler, Setophaga dominica
 Yellow-rumped warbler, Setophaga coronata

References 

 
Bird genera